Zuytpeene is a commune in the Nord department in northern France.

The small river Peene Becque flows through the village.

Population

Heraldry

See also
Communes of the Nord department

References

Communes of Nord (French department)
French Flanders